Parachinar is a small Pashtun (Turi and Bangash tribe) town which is the capital of Kurram District in the province of Khyber Pakhtunkhwa, Pakistan.

Parachinar is situated on a neck of Pakistani territory west of Peshawar, that juts into the Paktia, Logar and Nangarhar provinces of Afghanistan.

It is one of two urban areas in Kurram District, the other one being Sadda, and has shrunk considerably in population over the past few decades, becoming the least populous urbanized area in Kohat Division. Major tribes residing there are Turi, Bangash, Maqbal, Para Chamkini, Zazi and Mangal.

History 

The British soldier and historian C. M. Enriquez described the early history of Parachinar in his book The Pathan Borderland. He writes that Malak (leader) Pare was a reputable Malak of the Para Chamkini tribe, who were Sunni Muslim and another tribe called Turi (Shia), planted poplar trees some 200 years ago. Before much settlement, the area was mostly arid. In terms of distribution, the ancient poplar tree and the surrounding land belonged to the Parakhel tribe. This ownership is still authentic in official records or deeds of property. Parakhel tribesmen used to cultivate wheat in this desert area. During the wheat harvest, tents were pitched here, and in the shade of this poplar tree, jirgas and consultations were held.

The name Parachinar is derived as a result of social meetings conducted under a large chinar tree.[3] The remains of that tree are still there at a place now encompassed by the headquarters of Kurram Agency. As this poplar tree was located right between the British established offices and the Kurram militia, and people from remote areas of the Kurram Valley often came and gathered here, it became known as Parachinar instead of Totkai Bazar.

Durand Line Agreement 

In 1893, during the rule of Abdur Rahman Khan (Barakzai dynasty) of Afghanistan, a Royal Commission for demarcating a boundary between Afghanistan and the territory of British governed India negotiated terms, agreeing to the Durand line. Two parties camped at Parachinar, now part of Khyber Pakhtunkhwa, Pakistan, which is near Khost, Afghanistan.

From the British side, the camp was attended by Sir Mortimer Durand and Sahibzada Abdul Qayyum, assistant political agent, Khyber Agency. The Afghanistan interest was represented by Sahibzada Abdul Latif and the Governor of Khost Sardar Shireendil Khan, represented King Amir Abdur Rahman Khan.

2007 Kurram Agency conflict 

On 6 April 2007, a security gunman of Sunni Pashtun tribe fired upon a Shia Pashtun crowd protesting against Taliban, during Milad days in Parachinar. Violent clashes in the region occurred in the following week until a ceasefire was reached on 12 April 2007.

Terrorist incidents 

Parachinar has been the target of several terrorist attacks from 2007 to 2014 in which over 3000 people have died, making it the second-most targeted Pakistani city by militants after Peshawar.

Climate 
Parachinar has a moderate humid subtropical climate (Köppen climate classification Cfa). Although the city's southeasterly aspect relative to the valley in which it is situated allows it to receive on occasions significant monsoonal rainfall, the most frequent source of rain is western depressions and related thunderstorms. During the winter, snowfall is common, and frosts occur on most mornings. Snow closes the Peiwar Pass, located on the Paktia border just over 20 km west of Parachinar, for up to five months per year.

Demographics

The population of Parachinar is predominantly Shia. It is a small town of about 5,500 which has seen itself shrink considerably in population due to political strife caused by the Afghanistan Wars. It peaked in population in 1961, when it had over 22,000 people.

Education
FATA University plans to open a sub-campus at Parachinar.

Transportation
The Thall-Parachinar road is the main road connecting Parachinar to the rest of the country.

Parachinar has an airport but currently it is non-functional. In the past there was a flight service between Peshawar and Parachinar.

See also 

 List of cities in Khyber Pakhtunkhwa by population
 Kohat Division
 Hangu District
 Doaba
 Hangu
 Tall
 Karak District
 Karak
 Kohat District
 Kohat
 Lachi
 Shakardara
 Kurram District
 Sadda
 Orakzai District
 Pashto
 Battle of Tora Bora

References 

 
Populated places in Kurram District